The Board of Intermediate and Secondary Education, Multan was established on 30 March 1968. It is located near Gol Bagh, Gulgasht Colony, Multan.
It is responsible to take all Matriculation (Secondary) and Intermediate (Higher Secondary) exams (F.A /F.Sc.) of Multan Division schools and colleges as well as all the private candidates.

Multan board takes the examination from 9th class to 12th Class. Usually the Admissions are announced as follows:
 9th & 10th class during November/December every year
 1st & 2nd year during January/February every year
Results of these exams are announced as following schedule (Approximately +/- 2 days):
 Annual 10th/Combined Examination on 25 July 
 Annual 9th Fresh Examination on 25 August
 Annual Inter Part-II / Combined Examination on 12 September
 Annual Inter Part-I Fresh Examination on 10 October
 Supply 10th/Combined Examination on 10 November
 Supply Inter Part-II / Combined Examination on 12 January

Around 240,000 candidates appear for annual matric exam every year in BISE Multan and around 130,000 candidates appear for annual Intermediate exam every year. if we include the supply exams figures in it, we can say that every year the BISE Multan manage the exam process of around 400,000 candidates. And this figure is increasing around 10% yearly.

Jurisdiction 

Jurisdiction of Multan Board includes Multan Division which includes following districts:-
 Multan
 Khanewal
 Vehari
 Lodhran

See also 
 List of educational boards in Pakistan
 Board of Intermediate and Secondary Education, Sahiwal
 Board of Intermediate and Secondary Education, Dera Ghazi Khan
 Board of Intermediate and Secondary Education, Bahawalpur
 Board of Intermediate and Secondary Education, Lahore
 Board of Intermediate and Secondary Education, Faisalabad
 Board of Intermediate and Secondary Education, Rawalpindi
 Board of Intermediate and Secondary Education, Gujranwala
 Board of Intermediate and Secondary Education, Sargodha
 Board of Intermediate Education, Karachi
 Board of Secondary Education, Karachi
 Board of Intermediate and Secondary Education, Hyderabad

References

External links 
 Official Website of BISE Multan

Multan